Admiral Sir John Harvey, KCB (1772 – 17 September 1837) was an officer of the British Royal Navy during the French Revolutionary and Napoleonic Wars who held numerous commands and served in several actions during his long and distinguished career. Harvey was the eldest son of Captain John Harvey who was a distinguished officer of the eighteenth century who was killed in action at the battle of the Glorious First of June.

Early career
Born in 1772 at Eastry, Kent to Captain Harvey and Judith Harvey née Wise, Harvey was raised with his brothers at home and in the 1780s joined his uncle Captain Henry Harvey's ship HMS Rose off the North American station to train as a midshipman. His service continued until 1790 when at 18 he was promoted to lieutenant. Actively employed at the outbreak of the French Revolutionary Wars, Harvey was aided by family influence and gained command of the sloop HMS Actif on 5 September 1794 in the West Indies. Within three months, supported by the influence gained from his father's death at the Glorious First of June in the same year, Harvey was made post-captain, receiving promotion on 16 December. His brother Edward Harvey also received promotion to midshipman at the same time.

Thanks to family influence Harvey gained a prime commission in January 1795, serving aboard his uncle's flagship the second-rate HMS Prince of Wales as captain. In her, Harvey was extensively engaged during the following year, seeing action at the victory of the Battle of Groix where three enemy ships were taken and supporting the invasion of Quiberon Bay by Sir John Brolase Warren in 1796. In early 1797 Harvey followed his uncle to Trinidad, and supported the invasion of the island, helping capture it and the Spanish force there. Harvey was chosen to be sent home with the dispatches telling of the victory. Not long after arriving in England, Harvey married his first cousin in Sandwich, Kent.

Napoleonic Wars
During the next few years Harvey commanded several ships, including the frigates  and HMS Amphitrite in the West Indies and as part of the Cadiz blockade. Thus it was Sir Edward Berry who led Agamemnon at Trafalgar a few months later.

During the next eight years, Harvey fulfilled the blockade duties of any captain of a ship of the line, not achieving any major victories but steadily doing his duty with quiet success. Flag rank limited Harvey's employment prospects and it was not until the war was over that he was actively employed again, becoming commander-in-chief of the Leeward Islands Station between 1816 and 1818.

In 1819, Harvey retired and settled in Deal, Kent with his wife and daughter, Elizabeth Harvey, to lead a quiet life of the gentry. Promotions and honours steadily increased over the years, Harvey adding to the Companion of the Order of the Bath he had received in 1815 with elevation to Knight Commander in 1833 and promotion to vice-admiral in 1825 and full admiral just weeks before his death in January 1837. Harvey died on 17 February 1837 at his home in Deal.

Natural history collection 
During his lifetime Harvey amassed a large collection of natural history specimens that were subsequently obtained by the Oxford University Museum of Natural History.

Notes

References
 

1772 births
1837 deaths
Royal Navy admirals
Knights Commander of the Order of the Bath
Royal Navy personnel of the French Revolutionary Wars
Royal Navy personnel of the Napoleonic Wars
People from Deal, Kent
People from Eastry